Hatton House may refer to:

Haltoun House, Scottish baronial mansion
Hatton House (Pomaria, South Carolina)